Vincent Novello (6 September 17819 August 1861), was an English musician and music publisher born in London. He was a chorister and organist, but he is best known for bringing to England many works now considered standards, and with his son he created a major music publishing house.

Life
Vincent was the son of Giuseppe Novello, an Italian confectioner who moved to London in 1771. As a boy Vincent was a chorister at the Sardinian Embassy Chapel in Duke Street, Lincoln's Inn Fields, where he learnt the organ from Samuel Webbe; and from 1796 to 1822 he became in succession organist of the Sardinian, Spanish (in Manchester Square) and Portuguese (in South Street, Grosvenor Square) chapels, and from 1840 to 1843 of St Mary Moorfields. He taught music privately throughout his career. One of his most notable pupils was musicologist and music critic Edward Holmes. He was an original member of the Philharmonic Society, of the Classical Harmonists and of the Choral Harmonists, officiating frequently as conductor. In 1849 he went to live at Nice, where he died.

Legacy
Many of his compositions were sacred music, much of which was very popular. His great contribution, however, together with Christian Ignatius Latrobe, lay in the introduction to England of unknown compositions by the great masters, such as the Masses of Haydn and Mozart, the works of Palestrina, the treasures of the Fitzwilliam Museum, and innumerable, now well known great compositions. His first work, a collection of Sacred Music, as performed at the Royal Portuguese Chapel, which appeared in 1811, has the additional interest of dating the founding of the publishing firm Novello & Co which carries his name, as he issued the collection from his own house; and he did the same with succeeding works, until his son Joseph Alfred Novello (1810–1896), who had started as a bass singer, took over as head of the business in 1829 at the early age of nineteen.

It was Alfred who really created the business, and he is credited with introducing cheap music and of departing from the method of publishing by subscription. From 1841 Henry Littleton assisted him, becoming a partner in 1861, when the firm became Novello & Co., and, on J.A. Novello's retirement in 1866, sole proprietor. Having incorporated the firm of Ewer & Co. in 1867, the title was changed to Novello, Ewer & Co., and still later back to Novello & Co., and, on Henry Littleton's death in 1888, his two sons carried on the business.

Family

Novello and his wife, Mary Sabilla (née Hehl), had eleven children. Five of his daughters survived to adulthood, four of them gifted singers. Among the children were: 
 Mary Victoria Cowden Clarke (née Novello) (1809–1898), was a literary scholar and writer. She married the author (and friend of Keats) Charles Cowden Clarke, edited The Musical Times for four years and compiled one of the first concordances of Shakespeare.
 Joseph Alfred Novello (1810–1896), singer, music publisher, founded The Musical Times in 1844, retired in 1866 and sold off his stake in Novello & Co.
 Cecilia Serle (née Novello) (1812-1890) was an actress and singer, a pupil of the singing teacher Mrs. Blaine Hunt. She achieved early success on the stage but retired in 1836 when she married Thomas James Serle, a playwright, actor, novelist, and editor of a London weekly newspaper.
 Edward Petre Novello (1813-1836) showed promise as a painter but died young. He painted the family portrait, The Novello Family around 1830, and a portrait of Clara Novello in 1833. They are now at the National Portrait Gallery.<ref>'[https://www.npg.org.uk/collections/search/portrait/mw08384/The-Novello-Family?LinkID=mp05633&role=sit&rNo=0 'The Novello Family by Edward Petre Novello, National Portrait Gallery]</ref>
 Emma Aloysia Novello (1814–c. 1880), painter.
 Clara Novello (1818–1908), was a soprano, one of the best known vocalists in opera and oratorio, and on the concert stage, from 1833 onward. In 1843 she married Count Gigliucci, but after a few years returned to her profession, retiring in 1860. Charles Lamb wrote a poem (To Clara N.) in her praise.
 Sabilla Novello (1821–1904), singer, teacher of singing and translator.
 Florence Novello

References

Sources
Hurd, Michael: Vincent Novello and Company'' (London: Granada, 1981); 
Clarke, Mary Cowden: The life and labours of Vincent Novello, 1864, Novello & Co.

External links
 
 
 The Novello Family, National Portrait Gallery

1781 births
1861 deaths
19th-century classical composers
19th-century English musicians
English classical composers
English music publishers (people)
English people of Italian descent
Italian British musicians
Musicians from London
19th-century British composers
19th-century British businesspeople